is a Japanese football player. He plays for FC Osaka.

Career
Musashi Oyama joined J1 League club Cerezo Osaka in 2017.

Reserves performance

Last Updated: 28 February 2019

References

External links

1998 births
Living people
Association football people from Hokkaido
Japanese footballers
J3 League players
Japan Football League players
Cerezo Osaka players
Cerezo Osaka U-23 players
FC Osaka players
Association football midfielders